Uttarbanga Sambad is a Bengali language broadsheet published from Siliguri.

Uttarbanga Sambad was started on 19 May 1980 in a small letterpress in Siliguri. Due to its huge popularity, in 1981 web offset press was installed. Computerized typesetting was introduced in the year 1985. Afterwards, hi-speed 4-colour web offset press was introduced.

Uttarbanga Sambad is now printed simultaneously from Siliguri, Cooch Behar, Malda City, Alipurduar. 
The founder editor of Uttarbanga Sambad was Suhash Chandra Talukdar. Presently it is run by his son  Sabyasachi Talukder.

References

External links
Uttarbanga Sambad Official Website

Bengali-language newspapers published in India
Publications established in 1980
Siliguri
1980 establishments in West Bengal
Newspapers published in West Bengal